Famous or notable Vietnamese people include:

Art and design

Fashion 

Chloe Dao, fashion designer, winner of Project Runway Season 2
Đặng Thị Minh Hạnh, fashion designer
Nguyễn Thùy Lâm, Vietnamese model. She competed in Miss Universe 2008 and made into the top 15.
Trần Thị Hương Giang, Vietnamese model. She competed in Miss World 2009 and made into the top 16.
Võ Hoàng Yến, Vietnamese model. She competed in Miss Universe 2009 but was unplaced.
Thuy Diep, fashion designer
Thien LE, Vietnamese Canadian fashion designer and founder of the Thien Le label

Entertainment

Cinema 

Steve Tran, film & TV actor and singer
Maggie Q, actress, fashion model
Katsuni, adult actress
Kieu Chinh, actress
Thuy Trang, actress
Trà Giang, actress
Ngo Thanh Van, actress
Dustin Nguyen, actor
Dat Phan, comedian
Anh Do, comedian
Linh Dan Pham, actress
Kim Nguyen, Vietnamese-Canadian filmmaker, director
Ringo Le, producer, director, screenwriter
Ham Tran, producer, director, screenwriter
Steve Nguyen, producer, director, screenwriter
Doan Hoang, producer, director, screenwriter
Anh Duong, actress, model,socialite
France Nuyen, actress
Leyna Nguyen, newsreader in movies and television shows
Ke Huy Quan, Actor

Culinary 
Hung Huynh, chef, winner of Top Chef Season 3
Christine Ha, winner of MasterChef Season 3

Dance
Poreotics Matthew "Dumbo" Vinh Quoc Nguyen, Can "Candy" Trong Nguyen, & Charles Viet Nguyen

Literature 

Bao Ninh, novelist and short-story writer
Dương Thu Hương, novelist, short-story writer and dissident
Han Mac Tu, poet
Hồ Xuân Hương, poet
Nguyễn Chí Thiện, poet
Nguyễn Bỉnh Khiêm, poet
Nguyễn Du, poet
Nguyễn Ngọc Ngạn, novelist,mc,teacher,poet
Nguyễn Trãi, poet and statesman
Xuân Diệu, poet of love
Tố Hữu, poet
Trần Bích San, writer
Vương Trung Hiếu, writer
 Doan Van Toai, author, former student leader
 Pham Thi Hoai
 Lan Cao, author of "Monkey Bridge"
 Monique Truong, novelist
 Nam Le author of "The Boat", editor of the Harvard Review
 Bao Phi, poet and spoken word artist
 Quang X. Pham
 Andrew Lam
 Andrew X. Pham
 Aimee Phan

Media 

Leyna Nguyen, CBS Los Angeles local news anchor
Thanh Truong, NBC national news reporter
Stephanie Trong, Executive Editor of Nylon and Nylon Guys. Former Exec. Editor of Jane.
Natalie Tran, video blogger, comedienne on YouTube
Phạm Xuân Ẩn, journalist, spy for North Vietnam during the Vietnam War
Tila Tequila, TV personality
Ken Hoang, the "King" of the Super Smash Bros. video game
Michelle Phan, YouTube make-up guru and spokesperson for Lancôme Paris
Betty Nguyen, CBS Dallas local news anchor,CBS Morning News, CBS This Morning

Music 
Chuckie Akenz, rapper
Mohammed Al-Satij, ricon
Bằng Kiều, singer
Dam Vinh Hung,singer
Dang Thai Son, pianist
Diễm Liên, singer
Don Hồ, singer
Dương Triệu Vũ, singer
Hồ Lệ Thu , singer
Hong Nhung, singer
Huong Thuy, singer
Khánh Ly, singer
Kristine Sa, songwriter and singer
Lam Nhat Tien, singer
Lam Phương, composer
Le Tuan Hung, composer, performer, and musicologist
Leslie (singer), French singer

Loan Chau, singer
Lưu Hữu Phước, composer, inspired creation of the anthem for the Republic of Vietnam
Minh Tuyet, singer
My Linh, singer
My Tam, composer, songwriter, singer, MYTIME perfume owner
Niels Lan Doky, pianist
Như Quỳnh, singer
Ngoc Son, singer
Nguyễn Cao Kỳ Duyên, MC, singer, spokesperson for "Sua Ong Chua"
Nguyên Lê, musician, composer
Nguyen Thanh Hien, singer, dancer, and model, contestant of the Hungarian Pop Idol
Nhat Son, singer
Nhu Loan, singer
Phạm Duy, composer and songwriter
Phi Nhung, vocalist, singer
Phuong Thanh, singer
Quan Yeomans, vocalist and guitarist of Regurgitator
Quang Lê, singer
Roni Tran Binh Trong, singer, Finnish Idol' finalist
Steve Tran, singer, film & TV actor
Stevie Hoang, singer
Tâm Đoan, singer
Thanh Lam, singer
Thanh Bui, singer, Australian Idol'' finalist
Tran Thu Ha, singer
Trinh Cong Son, composer and songwriter, painter, and essayist
Trish Thuy Trang, singer
Truc Ho, composer, musician turned producer
Tyga, rapper
Văn Cao, composer, songwriter, poet, and painter, author of Vietnam's national anthem

Business 

Ung Thi, built and operated the Rex Hotel, in Ho Chi Minh City.
Trung Dung
Pham Duc Trung Kien
Bill Nguyen

History and politics

Kings and Queens 
Trưng Sisters

Emperors 

Minh Mạng
Đinh Tiên Hoàng, first Emperor
Hùng Vương
Dục Đức
Duy Tân
Gia Long (Vu Tien Long)
Hàm Nghi
Hiệp Hòa
Khải Định
Kiến Phúc
Ngô Quyền
Quang Trung

Presidents 

Ho Chi Minh
Nguyễn Hữu Thọ (acting)
Nguyễn Minh Triết (President)
Trần Đức Lương
Trường Chinh
Võ Chí Công

Former Republic of Vietnam (South Vietnam) 

Dương Văn Minh, last President
Ngô Đình Diệm, first President
Nguyễn Khánh, (Chairman of the Revolutionary Military Council, 1964)
Nguyễn Văn Thiệu
Phan Khắc Sửu
Trần Văn Hương

Secretary-General of Communist Party of Vietnam 
Đỗ Mười
Lê Duẩn
Lê Khả Phiêu
Nguyễn Văn Linh
Nông Đức Mạnh
Trường Chinh

Prime ministers 
Nguyễn Tấn Dũng

Democratic Republic of Vietnam, now Socialist Republic of Vietnam

Former Republic of Vietnam (South Vietnam) 
Nguyễn Cao Kỳ
Tran Thien Khiem
Tran Van Huong
Nguyen Xuan Oanh

Generals 
Cao Văn Viên, 4-star general of the Republic of Vietnam
Lê Minh Đảo
Lê Nguyên Vỹ, Republic of Vietnam brigadier general. He defeated Viet Cong forces in the Battle of An Lộc.
Ngô Quang Trưởng, Republic of Vietnam lieutenant general. He recaptured Huế from Northern communist forces in 1968 Tet Offensive.
Nguyễn Ngọc Loan, Republic of Vietnam general. He defended Saigon against Viet Cong forces in the Tet Offensive.
Nguyễn Thị Định
Nguyễn Văn Hiếu
Phạm Văn Đồng (ARVN general)
Trần Hưng Đạo, general. He twice defeated the Mongolian armies.
Trần Văn Hai
Trần Văn Trà
Trình Minh Thế
Văn Tiến Dũng
Võ Nguyên Giáp, general. He defeated France in the Battle of Dien Bien Phu.

Revolutionaries, politicians, and statesmen (not mentioned above) 

Phan Bội Châu
Joseph Cao (Cao Quang Ánh), former Louisiana representative in the United States House of Representatives
Charles Tran Van Lam
Đinh Xuân Lưu, Vietnamese Ambassador to Poland and Israel
Hoang Van Chi, South Vietnamese politician who publicized the Nhân Văn–Giai Phẩm affair in the North under Ho Chi Minh
Lê Đức Thọ, Nobel Peace Prize (declined), 1973
Hieu Van Le, Lieutenant Governor of New South Wales
Lý Long Tường
Kaysone Phomvihane, past Laotian Prime Minister (born Nguyen Cai Song)
Philipp Rösler, German vice-chancellor in Angela Merkel's administration
Trần Trọng Kim
Wayne Cao, Alberta provincial deputy speaker and MLA of the Alberta Legislative Assembly

Lawyers 
Jacques Vergès, lawyer who represented well-known war criminals

Religion 

Thích Thanh Từ
Thich Nhat Hanh
Thích Nhật Từ
Thích Quảng Độ
Nguyễn Văn Thuận, Cardinal
Philippe Trần Văn Hoài, Monsignor
Thích Quảng Đức, Buddhist

Sciences

Natural sciences and technology 

 André Truong Trong Thi, engineer
Tuan Vo-Dinh, Prof., Director of the Fitzpatrick Institute for Photonics of Duke University
 Nguyen Xuan Vinh, scientist and educator
 Duy-Loan Le
 Tan Le telecommunications entrepreneur, co-Founder of Emotiv, Young Australian of the Year 1998
 Hoàng Tụy, mathematician
 Ngô Bảo Châu, first Vietnamese mathematician to win the Fields Medal
 Trinh Xuan Thuan, astrophysicist
 Van H. Vu, mathematician
 Lê Văn Thiêm, mathematician
 Bui Tuong Phong, computer scientist
 Minh Quang Tran, physicist
 Jane Luu, astrophysicist
 Xuong Nguyen-Huu, biochemist
 Minh Le, computer game developer

Space travel 
Eugene H. Trinh, astronaut
Pham Tuân, cosmonaut

Social sciences 
Lê Quý Đôn, historian, encyclopedist, and philosopher
Luong Kim Dinh, catholic priest, scholar and philosopher

Sports 

Nguyen Tien Minh, badminton player, World Badminton Championship bronze medalist (2013)
Amy Tran, hockey player
Carol Huynh, Olympic wrestler. He won a gold medal for Canada.
Catherine Mai Lan Fox, Olympic swimmer with two gold medals
Chau Giang, professional poker
Cung Le, MMA/kickboxing champion and coach
Danny Graves, MLB baseball player
Dat Nguyen, NFL football player, Dallas Cowboys assistant linebackers and defensive quality control coach
David Pham, professional poker player
François Trinh-Duc, French professional rugby player
Howard Bach, badminton player, former world champion (2005)
Jim Parque, In 1996 was the only left-handed pitcher on the Olympic baseball team that won a bronze medal in Atlanta.
Lee Nguyen, professional soccer player
Men Nguyen, professional poker player
Mimi Tran, professional poker player
Nam Phan, professional MMA Fighter in the UFC
Nguyen Ngoc Truong Son, chess player
Paul Truong, chess coach
Rob Nguyen, Formula 3000 driver
Scotty Nguyen, professional poker player
Tran Hieu Ngan, taekwondo, first Vietnamese winning an Olympic medal (silver)
Yohan Cabaye, professional soccer player

See also 
Overseas Vietnamese
List of Vietnamese Americans
List of people by nationality

References 

List
 
Vietnamese